Bubeníček (feminine Bubeníčková) is a Czech surname meaning "little drummer". Notable people with the surname include:

 Ladislav Bubeníček, Czech gymnast
 Michelle Bubenicek, French historian
 Ota Bubeníček (1871–1962), Czech painter

Czech-language surnames